Mr. Tot aĉetas mil okulojn (English: Mr. Tot Buys A Thousand Eyes) is the third novel originally written in Esperanto by Jean Forge. It appeared in 1931. It is a fantasy adventure novel. The author's previous excessive use of suffixes, most noticeable in his previous work Saltego trans Jarmiloj, disappears in this novel.

A detective novel, but not a hair raising bloody fantasy. It is so modern, so richly saturated with psychological undertones and pulsating life, that its value greatly exceeds the standards that one generally has for novels of its genre.

The novel is included in William Auld's Basic Esperanto Reading List.

In 1960, Fritz Lang used the novel as a basis for his last film The Thousand Eyes of Dr. Mabuse.

Sources 

The first version of this page was translated from the corresponding article on the Esperanto Wikipedia.

References

Esperanto novels
1931 German novels
1931 fantasy novels
German fantasy novels
German mystery novels
German novels adapted into films
Novels by Jean Forge